Phyllomorpha is a genus of mostly European coreid bugs, sometimes referred-to as golden egg bugs.

Species
The Coreoidea Species File lists:
 Phyllomorpha lacerate Herrich-Schäffer, 1835
 Phyllomorpha laciniata (Villers, 1789) - type species (as Coreus hystrix Latreille)

References

External links
 
 

Phyllomorphini
Coreidae genera
Hemiptera of Europe